The castles in Spain were built mainly for the country's defense, particularly with respect to fortification. During the Middle Ages, northern Christian kingdoms had to secure their borders with their Muslim southern neighbours, thus forcing both Christian and Muslim kings to grant border fiefs to their liege noblemen so as to keep and maintain defensive fortresses. When the Reconquista advanced, those border castles lost their initial purpose, and, as in the rest of medieval Europe, they were used as noble residences and fief-keeps. Sporadic threats of war maintained their initial military purposes as enemy invasions were common. In some locations, such as the Basque country, fiefdoms did not exist as such, and noble families could not afford nor did they need huge fortresses, giving rise to many tower houses. In Muslim Spain many castle-palaces were built: the petty taifa kingdoms that arose after the fall of the Caliphate of Córdoba were militarily weak thus castles began taking on a more aesthetic purpose. During the late Middle Ages, Christian kingdoms had secured and enriched themselves well enough to support a more courtly lifestyle, so more residential castles were built, such as the Alcázar of Segovia, which was used as the main residence of the kings of Castile, whereas the Castle of Olite, built in a luxurious gothic style, was the seat of the Kingdom of Navarre's royal court.

After the Conquest of Granada in 1492, the Catholic monarchs ordered all the castles in their realms to be handed over to the Crown. Although the order was not completely carried out, the War of the Germanias, a rebellion against king Charles V in the early 16th century, forced the new Spanish Habsburg dynasty to continue the process, and many castles were demolished as well. Most of the castles in Spain were successively abandoned and dismantled, Spanish kings fearing noble and peasant revolts, especially in the newly conquered lands. Accordingly, some of them are nowadays in a state of decay, and although some restoration work has been done, the number of former castles is so large that the Spanish government lacks both the resources and the will to restore them all.

Andalucía

Almería 

 Alcazaba of Almería
 Castle of San Pedro
 Castle of Cuevas del Almanzora
 Castle of Gérgal
 Castle of Huebro
 Castle of San Cristóbal (Almería)
 Castle of San Juan de los Terreros
 Castle of Tabernas
 Castle of Vélez-Blanco
 Castle of the Peñón de las Juntas, Abla
 Casa Fuerte de la Cruceta
 El Castillejo (Abrucena), Abrucena
 Battery of Guardias Viejas
 Battery of San Felipe
 Battery of San Ramón
 Castle of Santa Ana
 Atalaya of San Miguel (Almería)
 Atalaya of the Perdigal, Almería
 Tower of Cárdenas
 Tower García
 Tower of la Garrofa (Almería)
 Tower of Macenas
 Tower of Medala (Tahal)
 Tower of la Vela Blanca, Níjar
 Houses Forts (Almería)
 Walls of Adra
 Caliphate Walls of Almería
 Castillo de las Escobetas, Garrucha

Cádiz 

 Alcázar of Jerez de la Frontera
 Caliphate Alcazaba of Tarifa
 Castle of Aznalmara
 Castle of Berroquejo
 Castle del Espíritu Santo
 Castle of Gigonza
 Castle of Melgarejo
 Castle of Santa Catalina (Cádiz)
 Castle of San Sebastián (Cádiz)
 Castle of Sancti Petri
 Castle of San Romualdo
 Castle of San Marcos (El Puerto de Santa María)
 Castle of Guzmán el Bueno
 Castle of Tarifa
 Castle of Zahara de la Sierra
 Castle of Zahara de los Atunes
 Castle of Jimena de la Frontera
 Castle of Alcalá de los Gazules
 Castle of Bornos
 Castle of Olvera
 Castle of Carastas
 Castle of Setenil de las Bodegas
 Castle of Arcos de la Frontera
 Castle of Benaocaz
 Castle of San Lorenzo del Puntal
 Castle del Puntal
 Castle of Conil de la Frontera
 Castle of La Cortadura
 Castle of Vejer de la Frontera
 Castle of Ben Alud
 Castle of Luna (Rota)
 Castle of Torre-Alháquime
 Castle of Fátima (Ubrique)
 Castle of Matrera (Villamartín)
 Castle of Berroquejo (Jerez de la Frontera)
 Castle of Torrestrella
 Castle Fortress of Tempul (Algar)
 Castle of Santiago (Sanlúcar de Barrameda)
 Castle of Medina-Sidonia
 Castle of Algeciras
 Castle del Lirio (Chiclana de la Frontera)
 Castle of Carteia (San Roque)
 Castle of Fatetar
 Castle of Doña Blanca
 Castle of Gibalbín
 Castle of Jimena
 Castle of Castellar de la Frontera
 Fort of San Luis
 Battery of Aspiroz
 Battery of San Genís
 Battery of Urrutia
 Battery of Zuazo
 Tower del Almirante
 Tower Alta
 Walls of Jerez del Frontera

Córdoba 

 Alcázar de los Reyes Cristianos (Alcázar of the Christian Monarchs)
 Castle of Almodóvar del Río
 Castle of Belalcázar
 Castle of Belmez
 Castle of Bujalance
 Castle of Almodóvar del Río
 Castle of los Sotomayor Zúñiga y Madroñiz (Belalcázar)
 Castle of Belmez
 Castle of Espejo
 Castle of Iznájar
 Castle of Torreparedones
 Castle of Zuheros
 Tower of Arias Cabrera
 Tower albarrana

Granada 

 Alhambra
 Alcazaba of Loja
 Alcazaba of Salobreña
 Alcazaba of Guadix
 Alcazaba of Baza
 Castle of La Calahorra
 Castle of Almuñécar
 El Castillejo (Los Guájares)
 Castle of Píñar
 Castle of Láchar
 Castle of Montefrío
 Castle of Moclín
 Castle of Iznalloz
 Castle of Illora
 Castle of Lanjarón
 Castle of Chite
 Castle of Dúrcal
 Castle of Lojuela
 Castle of Mondújar
 Castle of Restábal
 Fort of Juviles
 Atalaya of la Sierra del Muerto
 Atalaya of Sierra Bermeja
 Atalaya of Sierra Encantada
 Atalaya of the Campo-Botardo
 Atalaya of la Mesa
 Atalaya of la Porqueriza
 Atalaya of La Solana
 Atalaya of la Cantera de Valentín
 Atalaya of Cónchar
 Atalaya de Saleres
 Torreón of Huétor
 Towers Bermejas
 Tower atalaya of Mingoandrés
 Tower of la Gallina
 Tower of Marchena
 Tower del Tío Bayo
 Tower atalaya del Cautor
 Tower of la Rijana
 Silla del Moro
 Other castles in the municipality of Motril and Gualchos

Huelva 
 Alfayat of la Peña
 Castle of Almonaster la Real
 Castle of Aracena
 Castle of Aroche
 Castle of Ayamonte
 Castle of Cortegana
 Castle of Cumbres Mayores
 Castle fortress of Los Zúñiga (Cartaya)
 Castle of Gibraleón
 Castle of Moguer
 Castle of los Guzmanes (Niebla)
 Castle of Paymogo
 Castle of San Pedro de Huelva
 Castle of Sanlúcar de Guadiana
 Castle of Santa Olalla del Cala
 Tower del Catalán
 Tower de Isla Canela

Jaén 

 Castle of Abrehuí
 Castle of Albanchez de Mágina
 Castle of Alcaudete
 Castle of Aldehuela
 Castle of Andújar
 Castle of Arjona
 Castle of Begíjar
 Castle of Boabdil (Porcuna)
 Castle of Bujaraiza
 Castle of Burgalimar (Baños de la Encina)
 Castle of Canena
 Castle of Cardete
 Castle of Castro Ferral (Santa Elena)
 Castle of Fuencubierta
 Castle of Giribaile (Vilches)
 Castle of Hornos
 Old Castle of Jaén
 Castle of Jamilena
 Castle of Jódar
 Castle of la Aragonesa (Marmolejo)
 Castle of la Encomienda de Víboras
 Castle of La Guardia de Jaén
 Castle of la Iruela
 Castle of la Muña
 Castle of la Peña de Martos
 Castle of la Tobaruela (Linares)
 Castle of la Villa de Martos
 Castle of la Yedra
 Castle del Berrueco (Torredelcampo)
 Castle of Linares
 Castle of Lopera
 Castle of Mata Bejid (Cambil)
 Castle of Sabiote
 Castle del Trovador Macías (Arjonilla)
 Castle of las Navas de Tolosa
 Castle of Otíñar
 Castle of Peñaflor (Jaén)
 Castle of Peñolite
 Castle of the Peñón
 Castle of Tíscar
 Castle of Torredonjimeno
 Castle of Torre Alcázar
 Castle of Torre Venzala
 Castle of Torres de Albanchez
 Castle of Toya
 Castle of Santa Catalina (Jaén)
 Castle of Santa Eufemia (Cástulo)
 Castle of Segura de la Sierra
 Castillejo de Zumel
 Castle of la Torre de Martos
 Castle of Vilches
 Fortress of la Mota (Alcalá la Real)
 Towers of Santa Catalina
 Tower Olvidada
 Tower of Santa Ana (Alcalá la Real)
 Peñas de Castro
 Walls of Jaén
 Walls of Úbeda

Málaga 

 Alcazaba of Málaga
 Castle of Gibralfaro (Málaga)
 Sohail Castle
 Alcazaba of Antequera
 Alcazaba of Vélez-Málaga
 Castle del Águila
 Castle of Álora
 Castle of Archidona
 Castle of Bentomiz
 Castle of Bezmiliana
 Castle of Cártama
 Castle of Hins-Canit
 Castle of Jévar
 Castle of Santa Catalina (Málaga)
 Castle of Zalia
 Tower Battery of La Cala del Moral
 Tower Bermeja (Benalmádena)
 Tower of Calaburras
 Torre Ladrones
 Torre Río Real
 Tower of Calaburras
 Tower Molinos
 Tower del Muelle
 Tower Quebrada
 Nasrid Walls and Port Walls (Málaga)
 Phoenician Walls of Málaga
 Urban Walls of Marbella

Sevilla 

 Alcázar of the King Don Pedro
 Alcázar Puerta de Sevilla, Carmona
 Alcazar of Alcalá de Guadaíra
 Alcázar of Seville
 Castle of Cote (Montellano)
 Castle of El Coronil
 Castle of El Real de la Jara
 Castle of Estepa
 Castle of las Aguzaderas (El Coronil)
 Castle of Lebrija
 Castle of Los Molares
 Castle of Luna (Mairena del Alcor)
 Castle of Marchenilla (Alcalá de Guadaíra)
 Castle of Morón de la Frontera
 Castle of Setefilla
 Castle of Utrera
 Tower Abd el Aziz
 Torre del Oro
 Torre de la Plata
 Tower of la Rijana
 Tower of los Herberos

Aragón

Huesca 

 Castle of Arrés
 Castle of Alquezar
 Castle Palace of Argabieso
 Castle of Benabarre
 Castle of Boltaña
 Castle of Fantova
 Castle of Loarre
 Castle of Marcuello
 Castle of Monzón
 Castle of Montearagón
 Castle of Samitier
 Castle of Torres-Secas
 Citadel of Jaca
 Tower of Fiscal
 Walls of Antillón

Teruel 

 Castle of Albarracín
 Castle of Alcalá de la Selva
 Castle of Calanda
 Castle of Alcañiz
 Castle of Mora de Rubielos
 Castle of Ojos Negros
 Castle of Peracense
 Castle of Puertomingalvo
 Castle of Tornos
 Castle of Valderrobres
 Castle of Villel

Zaragoza 

 Castle of Aljafería
 Castle of Aranda de Moncayo
 Castle of Bichuesca
 Castle of Arandiga
 Castle of Grisel
 Castle of Biel
 Castle of Daroca
 Castle of Exarc de Moncayo
 Castle of Luesia
 Castle of Mesones de Isuela
 Castle of Sadaba
 Castle of Sibirana
 Castle of Trasmoz
 Castle of Uncastillo
 Castle of la Zuda (Borja)
 Castle Mayor (Daroca)
 Torreón of La Zuda
 Walls of Zaragoza

Principality of Asturias

 Castle of Alba (Quirós)
 Castle of Alba (Somiedo)
 Castle of Alesga
 Castle of Campogrande
 Castle of Las Caldas
 Castle of la Cabezada
 Castle of Gauzón
 Castle of Peña Manil
 Castle of Salas
 Castle of San Martín
 Castle of Soto (Aller)
 Castle of Soto (Ribera de Arriba)
 Castle of Soto de los Infantes
 Castle of Tudela
 Castle of Villademoros
 Castle of Villamorey
 Palace Ferrera (Báscones)
 El Torreón
 Torreón of Llanes
 Torreón of Lludeña
 Torreón of Peñerudes
 Tower del Valledor
 Tower of the Castle of Yabio
 Tower of los Valdés
 Tower of Proaza
 Tower of la Quintana
 Tower of los Valdés
 Tower of San Julián
 Tower of Tronquedo
 Walls of Oviedo

Basque Country

Araba 
 Castle of Zabala
 Castle of Gebara
 Castle of Eskibel
 Castle of Ocio
 Roman oppidum of Iruña-Veleia
 Tower of Mendoza
 Tower of los Varona
 Tower of Barrón
 Tower of Doña Otxanda in Vitoria-Gasteiz
 Tower of Orgaz and Tower of Kondestable
 Tower Negorta
 Tower-House of Calderondar eta Salazatar
 Tower-House of Galartza
 Walls of Vitoria-Gasteiz
 Old town of Vitoria-Gasteiz
 Walled town of Labraza
 Walled town of Antoñana
 Walled town of Laguardia
 Walled town of Gatzaga Buradon
 Walled town of Urizaharra

Gipuzkoa 

 Castle of Gaztelu Zahar
 Castle of Charles V
 Castle of la Mota in the Mount Urgull in San Sebastián
 Castle of Atxorrotx
 Fort of San Marcos
 Tower Idiakez
 Tower of Sasiola
 Tower Zumeltzegi
 Tower-House Enparan
 Walled town of Hondarribia
 Walled town of Leintz-Gatzaga

Biscay 
 Castle of Butrón
 Castle of Empress Eugénie de Montijo
 Castle of Muñatoizko San Martin
 Castle of Malmasin
 Complex of coastal fortresses of the Mount Serantes
 Fort of la Galea
 Torre Loizaga
 Tower of Lezama
 Tower Malpika
 Tower of Salazar
 Tower of Zamudio
 Tower Martiartu
 Tower of Muntsaratz
 Tower-House Likona
 Tower-House of Urrutia
 Walled town of Bermeo

Balearic Islands

 Castle of Alaró
 Castle of Amer
 Bellver Castle
 St. Philip's Castle, Mahón
 Castle of Bendinat
 Castle of Cabrera (Cabrera island)es
 Castle of Capdepera
 Castle of Pollensaes
 Castle of Santa Àgueda
 Castle of Santueri
 Fortress of Sant Carles
 Fortress of Isabella II

Canary Islands 
 Castle of la Luz
 Castle of Mata
 Castle of San Felipe (Puerto de la Cruz)
 Castle of San Francisco (Las Palmas de Gran Canaria)
 Castle of San Miguel (Garachico)
 Castle of Guanapay
 Castle of Paso Alto (Santa Cruz de Tenerife)
 Castle of San Joaquín
 Castle of San Cristóbal (Santa Cruz de Tenerife)
 Castle of St John the Baptist
 Castle of San Andrés
 Fortress of Santa Catalina (Las Palmas de Gran Canaria)
 Fort of Almeyda

Cantabria

 Castle of Aldueso
 Castle of Allendelagua
 Castle of Agüero
 Castle of Argüeso
 Castle of Castro Urdiales
 Castle of Cobejo
 Castle of El Collado
 Castle of El Haya
 Castle of Montehano
 Castle of Piñeres
 Castle of Pedraja
 Castle of San Felices de Buelna
 Castle of San Vicente de la Barquera
 Castle of Suances
 Castle of Treceño
 Castillo de Villamoñico
 Castle of Villegas
 Castle of Vispieres
 Palace of Riva-Herrera
 Fort del Mazo
 Battery of San Martín
 Battery of San Martín Alto
 Battery of San Pedro del Mar
 Low Battery of Galvanes

Castile and León

Ávila 
 Castle of La Adrada
 Castle of Don Álvaro de Luna (Arenas de San Pedro)
 Castle of Arévalo
 Castle of the Alcázar (Ávila)
 Castle of El Barco de Ávila
 Castle of Bonilla de la Sierra
 Castle of Zurraquín (Cabezas del Villar)
 Castle of El Mirón
 Castle of Aunqueospese (Mironcillo)
 Castle of Mombeltrán
 Castle of the Duke of Montellano (Narros de Saldueña)
 Castle Count of Rasura (Rasueros)
 Castle of Castronuevo (Rivilla de Barajas)
 Castle of Villaviciosa (Solosancho)
 Castle of Villatoro (Villatoro)
 Castle-Palace of Magalia (Las Navas del Marqués)
 Walls of Ávila

Burgos 
 Castle of Albillos (Villagonzalo-Pedernales)
 Castle of Arenillas de Muñó (Estepar)
 Castle of Belorado
 Castle of Burgos
 Castle of los Cartagena (Olmillos de Sasamón)
 Castle of Castrojeriz
 Castle of Coruña del Conde
 Castle of the Dukes of Frías (Frías)
 Castle of Espinosa de los Monteros (Espinosa de los Monteros)
 Castle of Frías
 Castle of Haza
 Castle of La Loja (Quintana de Valdivieso)
 Castle of Malvecino (Población de Valdivieso)
 Castle of Miranda de Ebro
 Castle of Monastery of Rodilla
 Castle of Olmillos de Sasamón
 Castle of Pancorbo
 Castle of Peñaranda de Duero (Peñaranda de Duero)
 Castle of Picón de Lara (Lara de los Infantes)
 Castle of Poza (Poza de la Sal)
 Castle of Rebolledo (Rebolledo de la Torre)
 Castle of Santa Gadea del Cid
 Castle of Sotopalacios
 Castle of Tedeja (Trespaderne)
 Castle of Torregalindo
 Castle of Torrepadierne (Pampliega)
 Castle of Úrbel (Urbel del Castillo)
 Castle of Villaute (Villaute)
 Castle of Virtus
 Castle of Velasco
 Castle of Zumel
 Fortress of Santa Engracia
 Arco de Santa María
 Tower of Bonifaz (Lomana)
 Tower of Loja
 Walls of Burgos

Leon 
 Castle of Alba (Llanos de Alba)
 Castle of Alcuetas or Tower of Alcuetas (Villabraz)
 Castle of Alija del Infantado or Castle of los Pimentel (Alija del Infantado)
 Castle of los Álvarez Acebedo (Valdepiélago)
 Castle of Arbolio (Valdepiélago)
 Castle of Aviados (Valdepiélago)
 Castle of Balboa (Balboa)
 Castle of Beñal (Riello)
 Castle of Los Barrios de Gordón (La Pola de Gordón)
 Castle of Castrocalbón (Castrocalbón)
 Castle of Cea (Cea)
 Castle of Cornatel or Castle of Ulver (Priaranza del Bierzo)
 Castle of Corullón (Corullón)
 Castle of Coyanza or Castle of Valencia de Don Juan (Valencia de Don Juan)
 Castle of Ferreras (Valderrueda)
 Castle of Grajal (Grajal de Campos)
 Castle of Laguna de Negrillos (Laguna de Negrillos)
 Castle of Luna (Los Barrios de Luna)
 Castle of Mansilla de las Mulas (Mansilla de las Mulas)
 Castle of Nogarejas (Castrocontrigo)
 Castle of Palacios de Valduerna or Castle of los Bazán (Palacios de la Valduerna)
 Castle of Peñarramiro (Truchas)
 Castle of Ponferrada, Castle of the Templars or Castle del Temple (Ponferrada)
 Castle of Portilla or Castle of the Queen Berenguela (Boca de Huérgano)
 Castle of los Quiñones (Quintana del Marco)
 Castle of Riaño (Riaño)
 Castle of Santa María de Ordás or Tower of Ordás (Santa María de Ordás)
 Castle of Sarracín, Castle of Vega de Valcarce or Castrum Sarracenicum (Vega de Valcarce)
 Castle of Siero (Siero de la Reina, Boca de Huérgano)
 Castle of Tapia or Tower of Tapia (Rioseco de Tapia)
 Castle of the Towers, Puerta Castillo or Arco de la Cárcel (León)
 Castle of Villalobos (Valderas)
 Castle of Villanueva de Jamuz (Santa Elena de Jamuz)
 Castle of Villapadierna (Cubillas de Rueda)
 Castle of Turienzo or Tower of los Osorio (Turienzo de los Caballeros)
 Castle-Palace de los Quiñones (San Emiliano)
 Castle-Palace of los Marqueses de Villafranca (Villafranca del Bierzo)
 Castle-Palace of Renedo de Valdetuéjar (Renedo de Valdetuéjar)
 Castle-Palace of Almanza (Almanza)
 Castle-Palace of los Guzmanes (Toral de los Guzmanes)
 Castle-Palace of los Tovar or Torreón of los Tovar (Boca de Huérgano)
 Tower of Babia (Babia)
 Tower of Canseco (Canseco, Cármenes)
 Tower of Fresno de la Valduerna (Villamontán de la Valduerna)
 Tower of Laguna de Somoza (Val de San Lorenzo)
 Tower of Puebla de Lillo (Puebla de Lillo)
 Tower of La Vecilla (La Vecilla de Curueño)
 Tower of La Vid (La Pola de Gordón)

Palencia 
 Castle of Abia de las Torres
 Castle of Aguilar de Campoo
 Castle of Ampudia
 Castle of Amusco
 Castle of Antigüedad
 Castle of Astudillo
 Castle of Autilla del Pino
 Castle of Autillo de Campos
 Castle of Belmonte de Campos (Belmonte de Campos)
 Castle of Agüero (Buenavista de Valdavia)
 Castle of Castrillo de Villavega
 Castle of las Cabañas de Castilla
 Castle of Sarmiento (Fuentes de Valdepero)
 Castle of Monzón de Campos
 Castle of Gama
 Castle of Hornillos de Cerrato
 Castle of Palenzuela
 Castle of the Counts of Saldaña
 Castle of la Estrella de Campos (Torremormojón)
 Castle of Valderrábano
 Castle of Villanueva de la Torre (Barruelo de Santullán)

Salamanca 
 Alcázar of Salamanca
 Castle of Ledesma
 Castle of Alba de Tormes
 Castle of Ciudad Rodrigo or Castle of Henry II of Castile
 Castle of Ledesma
 Castle of Sobradillo
 Castle of Béjar
 Castle of Miranda del Castañar
 Castle of Monleón
 Castle of Montemayor del Río
 Castle of Puente del Congosto
 Castle of San Felices de los Gallegos
 Castle del Buen Amor or Castle of Villanueva de Cañedo
 Castle of San Martín del Castañar
 Royal Fortress of the Concepcion or Castillo de Aldea del Obispo

Segovia 
 Alcázar of Segovia
 Castle of Castilnovo
 Castle of Coca (Coca)
 Castle of Cuéllar
 Castle of Pedraza (Pedraza)
 Castle of Turégano

Soria 

 Castle of Almenar (Almenar de Soria)
 Castle of Berlanga (Berlanga de Duero)
 Castle of Osma (El Burgo de Osma)
 Castle of Calatañazor
 Castle of Caracena
 Castle of Gormaz
 Castle of Hinojosa de la Sierra
 Castle of Magaña
 Castle of Medinaceli
 Castle of Monteagudo de las Vicarías
 Castle of Montuenga
 Castle of Peñalcázar
 Castle of la Raya (Monteagudo de la Vicarías)
 Castle of Rello
 Castle of San Leonardo (San Leonardo de Yagüe)
 Castle of San Pedro Manrique
 Castle of Somaén
 Castle of Soria
 Castle of Ucero
 Castle of Yanguas
 Fortress of Serón de Nágima
 Arab Walls of Ágreda

Valladolid 

 

 Castle of Alaejos
 Castle of Barcial de la Loma
 Castle of Canillas de Esgueva
 Castle of Castromembibre
 Castle of Castroverde de Cerrato
 Castle of Curiel de Duero
 Castle of Encinas de Esgueva
 Castle of Foncastín
 Castle of Fuensaldaña (Fuensaldaña)
 Castle of Fuente el Sol
 Castle of Íscar
 Castle of La Mota
 Castle of Montealegre de Campos (Montealegre de Campos)
 Castle of Mucientes
 Castle of Peñafiel
 Castle of Portillo
 Castle of San Pedro de Latarce
 Castle of Simancas (Simancas)
 Castle of Tiedra
 Castle of Tordehumos
 Castle of Torrelobatón (Torrelobatón)
 Castle of Trigueros del Valle
 Castle of Urueña (Urueña)
 Castle of Villafuerte de Esgueva
 Castle of Villagarcia de Campos
 Castle of Villalba de los Alcores
 Castle of Villavellid
 Castle-Palace of Curiel de Duero or Castle-Palace of los Zúñiga
 Walls of Curiel de Duero (Curiel de Duero)
 Walls of Mayorga (Mayorga)
 Walls of Medina de Rioseco (Medina de Rioseco)
 Walls of Medina del Campo (Medina del Campo)
 Walls of Olmedo (Olmedo)
 Walls of Peñafiel (Peñafiel)
 Walls of Portillo (Portillo)
 Walls of Tordesillas (Tordesillas)
 Walls of Torrelobatón (Torrelobatón)
 Walls of Tudela de Duero (Tudela de Duero)
 Walls of Urueña (Urueña)
 Walls of Valbuena de Duero (Valbuena de Duero)
 Walls of Valladolid (Valladolid)
 Walls of Villabrágima (Villabrágima)
 Walls of Villalba de los Alcores (Villalba de los Alcores)

Zamora 
 Álcazar of Toro
 Castle of Asmesnal or Castle of Alfaraz
 Castle of Alcañices
 Castle of Alba (Losacino)
 Castle of the Counts of Benavente
 Castle of Castrotorafe
 Castle of Fermoselle
 Castle of Granucillo
 Castle of Peñausende
 Castle of Puebla de Sanabria
 Castle of Villalonso
 Castle of Villalpando
 Castle of Villa Ceide
 Castle of Zamora
 Torreón of Ayoó de Vidriales
 Tower del Caracol
 Walls of Zamora

Castile-La Mancha

Albacete 
 Castle of Caudete
 Castle of Chinchilla de Montearagón
 Castle of Almansa
 Castle of Sierra
 Castle of Montealegre del Castillo
 Castle of Peñas de San Pedro
 Castle of Munera
 Castle of Alcaraz
 Castle of Alcalá del Júcar
 Castle of La Encomienda
 Castle of Tobarra
 Castle of Yeste
 Castle of Cotillas
 Castle of Ves
 Castle of Llano de la Torre
 Castle of Taibilla
 Castle of Bienservida
 Castle of Rochafrida
 Castle of Vegallera
 Old castle of Carcelén

Ciudad Real 
 Castle of Alarcos
 Castle of Alhambra (Ciudad Real)
 Castle of Calatrava la Vieja
 Castle-Convent of Calatrava la Nueva
 Castle of Caracuel
 Castle of Doña Berenguela
 Castle of la Estrella
 Castle of Miraflores (Piedrabuena)
 Castle of Montizón
 Castle of Pilas Bonas
 Castle of Peñarroya
 Castle of Salvatierra
 Tower of Terrinches or Castle of Terrinches

Cuenca 
 Castle of Cuenca, (Cuenca)
 Castle of Alarcón
 Castle of Belmonte
 Castle of Garcimuñoz
 Castle of Huete, Alcazaba of Wabda or Castle of Luna
 Castle of Puebla de Almenara - (Puebla de Almenara)
 Castle of Haro (Villaescusa de Haro)
 Castle of Moya (Moya)
 Castle of Rochafrida Beteta
 Castle del Cañavate, (El Cañavate)
 Castle of Santiago de la Torre, (San Clemente)
 Castle of Paracuellos, (Paracuellos)
 Castle of Uclés, (Uclés)
 Castle of Montalbo, (Montalbo)
 Castle of La Hinojosa, (La Hinojosa)
 Castle of Rus, (San Clemente)
 Castle of Minglanilla, (Minglanilla)
 Castle of Iniesta, (Iniesta)
 Castle of Zafra de Záncara, (Zafra de Záncara)
 Castle of Huélamo, (Huélamo)
 Castle of Cañete, (Cañete)
 Tower Mangana, (Cuenca)
 Tower of the Moor, (Honrubia)
 Old Tower, (San Clemente)
 Tower of Ranera, (Talayuelas)

Guadalajara 
 Alcázar Real de Guadalajara
 Alcazaba of Zorita, in Zorita de los Canes
 Castle of Albalate de Tajuña, in the municipality of Luzaga
 Castle of Albaráñez, near Salmerón
 Castle of Alcocer
 Castle of Alcorlo, Castle del Corlo or Castle del Congosto, in San Andrés del Congosto
 Castle of Algar de Mesa
 Castle of Alhóndiga
 Castle of Almalaff, near Hortezuela de Océn
 Castle of Almoguera
 Castle of Alpetea, in the municipality of Villar de Cobeta
 Castle of Anguix
 Castle of Aragosa
 Castle of Arbeteta
 Castle of Atienza
 Castle of Baides
 Castle of Bembibre, in Castilmimbre
 Castle of Berninches
 Castle of Canales del Ducado
 Castle of Casasana
 Castle of Castejón de Henares
 Castle of Castilforte
 Castle of Castilnuevo
 Castle of Cobeta
 Castle of Codes
 Castle of the Count Don Julián, in the municipality of Taravilla
 Castle of Cogolludo
 Castle del Cuadrón or Castle of Santa Ana, in Auñón
 Castle of Cuevas Minadas
 Castle of Diempures, in Cantalojas
 Castle of Don Juan Manuel, in Cifuentes
 Castle of Doña Urraca or Castle of Molinán, in Beleña de Sorbe
 Castle of Durón
 Castle of Embid
 Castle of Escamilla
 Castle of Escopete
 Castle of Espinosa de Henares or El Palacio
 Castle of Establés or Castle of the Bad Shadow
 Castle of Fuentelencina and Tower of the Moor Cantana
 Castle of la Fandiña, in the municipality of Taravilla
 Castle of Fuentelsaz
 Castle of Fuentelviejo
 Castle of Fuentes, in Fuentes de la Alcarria
 Castle of los Funes, in Villel de Mesa
 Castle of Galve de Sorbe or Castle of the Zúñiga
 Castle of Guijosa
 Old castle of Guijosa
 Castle of Guisema, in the municipality of Tortuera
 Castle of Hita
 Castle of Hueva
 Castle of Inesque, between Angón and Pálmaces de Jadraque, in the municipality of Atienza
 Castle of Jadraque or Castle of the Cid
 Castle of Labros
 Castle of La Yunta
 Castle of Loranca de Tajuña
 Castle of Mandayona
 Castle of Mayrena, in Horche
 Castle of Mesa, in the municipality of Villel de Mesa
 Castle of Miedes de Atienza
 Castle of Milmarcos
 Castle of Mochales
 Castle of Molina de Aragón or Fortress of Molina de los Caballeros
 Castle of Mondéjar
 Castle of Montarrón
 Castle of the Moor, en Terzaga
 Castle of the Moors (Luzón), near Luzón
 Castle of the Moors (Tierzo), in Tierzo
 Castle of Motos
 Castle of Muduex
 Castle of Murel de Tajo or Castle of Santa María de Murel, between Morillejo and Carrascosa de Tajo
 Castle of Ocentejo
 Castle of Orea
 Castle of Palazuelos
 Castle of Pareja
 Castle of Pelegrina
 Castle of Peña Bermeja, in Brihuega
 Castle of Peñahora, near Humanes
 Castle of Peñalén
 Castle of Peñalver
 Castle of las Peñas Alkalathem or Castle of las Peñas Alcalatenas, between Trillo and Viana de Mondéjar, on one of the Tetas de Viana
 Pesebrico del Cid, Castle of Álvaro Yáñez or Castle of Barafáñez, near Romanones
 Castle of Pioz
 Castle of Rocha Frida, in the municipality of Atanzón
 Castle of Rueda de la Sierra
 Castle of Saceda, near Peralejos de las Truchas
 Castle of Salmerón
 Castle of Santiuste, near Corduente
 Castle of Sigüenza
 Castle of Riba de Santiuste
 Castle of Tamajón
 Castle of Tendilla
 Castle of Trillo
 Castle of Torija
 Castle of Torresaviñán, Castle of San Juan (La Torresaviñán) or Castle of la Luna, in La Torresaviñán
 Castle of Trijueque
 Castle of Uceda
 Castle of Valfermoso de Tajuña
 Castle of Valtablado del Río
 Castle of Vállaga, in the municipality of Illana
 Castle of Viana de Mondéjar
 Castle of Yunquera de Henares
 Castle of Zafra (Guadalajara), near Campillo de Dueñas
 Fortress of Alcolea de Torote, between Torrejón del Rey and Galápagos
 Fortress of Las Inviernas
 Fortress of Otilla
 Fortress of Torrecuadrada de los Valles
 Fortress of Torrecuadrada de Molina
 Fort fusilier of San Francisco, in Guadalajara
 Atalaya of los Casares, in the municipality of Riba de Saelices
 Atalaya of San Marcos (Centenera de Suso), in the municipality of Atanzón
 Tower of Séñigo, near Sigüenza
 Tower of Aragón, in Molina de Aragón
 Tower of Chilluentes, in the municipality of Tartanedo
 Tower of Doña Blanca (Taravilla), in the municipality of Taravilla
 Tower of la Almofala
 Fort-House of La Bujeda, between Traíd and Otilla
 Fort-House of Setiles
 Fort-House of la Vega de Arias, near Tierzo
 Casilla de los Moros, in Membrillera

Toledo 
 Alcázar of Toledo
 Castle of Alamín
 Castle of Consuegra
 Castle of Villalba
 Castle of San Servando
 Castle of Montalbán
 Castle of Olmos
 Castle of Guadamur
 Castle of Oropesa
 Castle of Malpica de Tajo
 Castle of Mascaraque
 Castle of la Vela
 Castle of Almonacid
 Castle of Peñas Negras
 Castle of Cuerva
 Castle of Barcience
 Castle of Malamoneda
 Castle of Orgaz
 Castle of Dos Hermanas
 Castle of Oreja
 Castle of Guadalerzas
 Castle of Peñaflor
 Castle of San Silvestre
 Castle of Casarrubios del Monte
 Castle of San Vicente
 Castle of Monreal
 Castle of Gálvez
 Castle-palace of Escalona
 Walls and towers albarranas (Talavera de la Reina)

Catalonia

Barcelona 

 Castle of Burriac
 Castle of Cardona
 Castle of Castelldefels
Castle of Castellet
 Castle of Claramunt
 Castle of Dosrius
 Castle of Montjuic
 Castle of Orís
 Castle of Santa Florentina
 Castle of Tagamanent
 Castle charterhouse of Vallparadís
 Castle of Castellbell
 Castellciuró
 Castle of Centelles
 Castle of Cervelló
 Castle of Cornellà
 Castle d'Eramprunyà
 Castle of Gallifa
 Castle of la Roca del Vallès
 Castle of Mogoda
 Castle of Palafolls
 Castle of Pallejà
 Castle of Plegamans
 Castle of la Pobla de Lillet
 Castle of Castellcir
 Castle of Rajadell
 Castle of Rubí
 Castle of Taradell
 Castle of Bell-lloc
 Castle of Montesquiu
 Castle of Montpalau
 Castle of Montbui (Bigues)
 Castle of Vilassar
 Castle of Granera
 Castle of Penya del Moro
 Tower Vermella
 Castle of the Camp de la Bota

Tarragona 

 Castle of Miravet
 Castle of the Count Sicart
 Castle of Tamarit
 Castle of Montclar (Pontils)
 Castle of Torredembarra
 Castle of Castellet
 Castle of Rocamora
 Monastery of Sant Miquel d'Escornalbou
 Torre Vella de Salou
 Tower d'en Dolça
 Walls of Montblanc
 Walls of Tarragona

Girona 

 Vila Vella enceinte of Tossa de Mar
 Castle of Montsoriu
 Castle of Peralada
 Castle of la Tallada (Baix Empordà)
 Castle of Sant Joan de Blanes
 Castle of Requesens
 Castle of Palau-sator
 Castle of Palau Sacosta
 Castle of Bufalaranya
 Castell de Cabrera (Alt Empordà)
 Castle d'Espolla
 Castle of Llagostera
 
 Castle of Púbol
 Castle of Quermançó
 Castle of Rocabertí
 Castle of Rupià
 Castle of Sant Ferran
 Castle of Verdera
 Castle of Vulpellac
 Castle d'Albons
 Castle of Llívia
 Castle of the Montgrí
 Castle of Farners
 Castle of Verges
 Castle-palace of la Bisbal
 Castle of Falgons https://castelldefalgons.com/

Lleida 

 Castle and village of Talarn
 Alcazaba of Lleida (Suda de Lleida)
 Castle of Maldà
 Castle of Besora
 Castle of Gardeny
 Castle of Montsonis
 Castle of la Tallada (Segarra)
 Castle d'Albatàrrec
 Castle of Basturs
 Castle of Benavent de la Conca
 Castle of Biscarri
 Castle of Castellnou d'Ossó
 Castle of Castelló de Farfanya
 Castle d'Abella de la Conca
 Castle d'Escarlà
 Castell d'Espills
 Castle of Llordá
 Castle of Sant Miquel de la Vall
 Castle of Sarroca de Bellera
 Castle of Serradell
 Castle of Toralla
 Castle of Ciutadilla
 Castle of Concabella
 Castle d'Enfesta
 Castle of Gurp
 Castle of Llimiana
 Castle of Madrona
 Castle of Sant Marçal
 Castle of Mur
 Castle de la Pedra
 Castle of Sallent (Pinell de Solsonès)
 Castle of Sanaüja
 Castle of Sapeira
 Castle of les Sitges
 Castle of Toló
 Castle of Pallars
 Castle of Verdú
 Castle d'Eroles
 Castle of Miralles
 Castle d'Orrit
 Castle of Ratera
 Castle of Ciutat
 Castle of Puigcercós
 Castle of the Remei
 Castle of Santa Engràcia
 Castle of Vilamitjana
 Castle of Viuet
 Atalaya of the Castle of Guimerà

Extremadura

Cáceres 

 Alcázar of Alcántara
 Alcázar of Galisteo
 Alcázar of Plasencia
 Castle of Floripes
 Castle of Almaraz
 Castle of las Arguijuelas de Abajo
 Castle of las Arguijuelas de Arriba
 Castle of Arroyo de la Luz
 Castle of Belvís de Monroy
 Castle of Bernardo
 Castle of Brozas
 Castle of Cabañas del Castillo
 Castle of Cañamero
 Castle of Coria
 Castle of Eljas
 Castle of Granadilla
 Castle of Grimaldo
 Castle of Mayoralgo
 Castle of los Mogollones
 Castle of Mohedanos
 Castle of Monfragüe
 Castle of Monroy
 Castle of Montánchez
 Castle of la Peña del Acero
 Castle of Peñafiel (Zarza la Mayor)
 Castle of los Pizarro (Segura de la Sierra)
 Castle of Portezuelo
 Castle of Salor
 Castle of Salvaleón
 Castle of Santibáñez el Alto
 Castle of las Seguras
 Castle of Torremenga
 Castle of Trevejo
 Castle of Trujillo
 Castle of Valverde de la Vera
 Castle of Viandar de la Vera
 Castle Palace of the Counts of Oropesa or Castle of Jarandilla
 Palace of Sotofermoso
 Fortress of Aldea del Cano
 Tower of Bujaco
 Almenara of Gata
 Walls of Plasencia

Badajoz 

 Alcazaba of Badajoz
 Alcazaba of Mérida
 Alcazaba of Reina
 Castle of Alange
 Castle of Alburquerque
 Castle of Alconchel
 Castle of Fregenal de la Sierra
 Castle of Almorchón
 Castle of Azuaga
 Castle of Benquerencia de la Serena
 Castle of Burguillos del Cerro
 Castle of Capilla
 Castle of La Codosera
 Castle of la Encomienda
 Castle of Feria
 Castle of Fuente del Maestre
 Templar Castle of Fregenal de la Sierra
 Castle of Herrera del Duque
 Castle of Higuera de Vargas
 Castle of Hornachos
 Castle of Jerez de los Caballeros
 Castle of Luna
 Castle of Magacela
 Castle of Mayorga
 Castle of Medellín
 Castle of Montemolín
 Castle of Olivença
 Castle of Puebla de Alcocer
 Castle of Nogales
 Castle of Piedrabuenap
 Castle of Salvaleón
 Castle of Salvatierra de los Barros
 Castle of Segura de León
 Castle of the Towers
 Castle of Villagarcía de la Torre
 Castle of la Vaguada
 Castle of Zafra (Badajoz)
 Castle of Zalamea de la Serena

Galicia

A Coruña 
 Castle of Naraío, (San Sadurniño)
 Castle of Andrade or Fortress da Nogueirosa, (Pontedeume)
 Castle da Lúa, (Rianxo)
 Castle da Rocha Forte, (Santiago de Compostela)
 Castle da Rocha Branca, (Padrón)
 Castle of Fruzo, (Arzúa)
 Castle of Mesía, (Mesía)
 Castle of San Carlos (Finisterre)
 Castle da Palma
 Castle of Moeche
 Castle of Vimianzo, (Vimianzo)
 Castle of Cardenal, (Corcubión)
 Castle of Casón, (Ortigueira)
 Castle do Pico Sacro, (Boqueixón)
 Castle do Príncipe, (Cee)
 Castle do Soberano, (Camariñas)
 Castle of Santo Antón
 Castle of San Felipe, (Ferrol)
 Fortress da Mota de Ois, (Coirós)
 Fort of Santa Cruz, (Oleiros)
 Torreón dos Andrade, (Pontedeume)
 Towers of Altamira, (Brión)
 Towers of Mens, (Malpica de Bergantiños)
 Towers do Allo, (Zas)
 Tower of Penela, (Cabana de Bergantiños)
 Tower of Celas de Peiro, (Culleredo)
 Tower of Cillobre, (A Laracha)
 Tower of Figueroa, (Abegondo)
 Tower of Hercules, (A Coruña)
 Tower of Lama, (Mañón)
 Tower of Nogueira, (Coristanco)
 Tower of Orseño, (Porto do Son)
 Tower of Xunqueiras, (A Pobra do Caramiñal)
 Tower do Concello, (Betanzos)
 Tower pazo de Vilardefrancos, (Carballo)
 Tower of Goiáns, (Boiro)
 Walls of Santiago de Compostela

Lugo 
 Castle da Frouseira, (Foz)
 Castle da Mota (Guntín), (Guntín)
 Castle da Pobra de Parga, (Guitiriz)
 Castle of Amarante, (Antas de Ulla)
 Castle of Arcos, (Chantada)
 Castle of Burón, (A Fonsagrada)
 Castle of Caldaloba, (Cospeito)
 Castle of Carbedo, (O Courel)
 Castle do Castrodouro, (Alfoz)
 Castle of Castroverde, (Castroverde)
 Castle of Doiras, (Cervantes)
 Castle of Maside, (Pantón)
 Castle of Miraz, (Friol)
 Castle of Monforte de Lemos, (Monforte de Lemos)
 Castle of Navia, (Navia de Suarna)
 Castle of Pambre, (Palas de Rei)
 Castle of Penas, (Monterroso)
 Castle of Peñaflor, (Riotorto)
 Castle of Saavedra, (Begonte)
 Castle of Sarria, (Sarria)
 Castle of Sequeiros, (Quiroga)
 Castle of Torés, (As Nogais)
 Castle of Tovar, (Lourenzá)
 Castle of Vilalba, (Vilalba)
 Castle Tower of Novaes, (Quiroga)
 Fortress of San Paio de Narla, (Friol)
 Fort of San Damián, (Ribadeo)
 Tower Fortress of Friol, (Friol)
 Tower da Bastida, (Pantón)
 Tower da Candaira, (O Saviñao)
 Tower of Doncos, (As Nogais)
 Tower of Gorrete, (Mondoñedo)
 Tower of Hospital, (O Incio)
 Tower of Marce, (Pantón)
 Tower of Moreda, (Monforte de Lemos)
 Tower of Quindimil, (Palas de Rei)
 Tower of Sobrada, (Outeiro de Rei)
 Tower of Taboada, (Taboada)
 Tower of Taboi, (Outeiro de Rei)
 Tower of Támoga, (Cospeito)
 Tower do Mouro, (Riotorto)
 Fort-House of Lusio, (Samos)
 Tower-House of Friol, (Friol)
 Tower-House of Güimil, (O Saviñao)
 Walls of Lugo

Ourense 
 Alcázar of Milmanda, (Celanova)
 Castle da Peroxa, (A Peroxa)
 Castle of Allariz, (Allariz)
 Castle of Castro Caldelas, (Castro Caldelas)
 Castle of Cinconogueiras, (A Peroxa)
 Castle of Fontearcada, (A Peroxa)
 Castle of Maceda, (Maceda)
 Castle of Monterrei, (Monterrei)
 Castle da Piconha, (Calvos de Randín)
 Castle of Ribadavia, (Ribadavia)
 Castle of Roucos, (Cenlle)
 Castle of Sandiás, (Sandiás)
 Castle of Vilamarín, (Vilamarín)
 Castle do Castro, (O Barco de Valdeorras)
 Fortress of Sande, (Cartelle)
 Pazo da Torre de Soutopenelo, (San Cibrao das Viñas)
 Tower da Forxa, (Porqueira)
 Tower da Pena da Portela, (Xinzo de Limia)
 Tower of Torán, (Taboadela)
 Tower of Viana, (Viana do Bolo)
 Tower of Vilanova dos Infantes, (Celanova)
 Tower do Bolo, (O Bolo)

Pontevedra 
 Castle of Alemparte, (Fornelos de Montes)
 Castle of Cira, (Silleda)
 Castle of Fornelos, (Crecente)
 Castle of Lobeira, (Vilanova de Arousa)
 Castle of Monterreal, (Baiona)
 Castle of Salvaterra, (Salvaterra de Miño)
 Castle of Sobroso, (Mondariz)
 Castle of Soutomaior, (Soutomaior)
 Castle of Tebra, (Tomiño)
 Castle of Ubeiras, (Vilaboa)
 Castle do Penzo, (Vigo)
 Fortress of Borraxeiros, (Agolada)
 Fortress of Gondomar, (Gondomar)
 Fortress of Rodeiro, (Rodeiro)
 Fortress of San Lourenzo, (Tomiño)
 Tower-Fortress of Castro de Montes, (Forcarei)
 Towers of Miadelo, (Vilagarcía de Arousa)
 Torres de Oeste, (Catoira)
 Tower da Barreira, (A Estrada)
 Tower of A Lanzada, (O Grove)
 Tower of Camba, (Rodeiro)
 Tower of Fafián, (Rodeiro)
 Tower of Guimarei, (A Estrada)
 Tower of San Sadurniño, (Vilagarcía de Arousa)

Community of Madrid

 Castle of La Alameda (Madrid)
 Castle of Alcalá la Vieja (Alcalá de Henares)
 Castle of Aulencia
 Castle of Batres
 Castle of Buitrago del Lozoya
 Castle of Casasola (Chinchón)
 Castle of Chinchón
 Castle of la Coracera (San Martín de Valdeiglesias)
 Castle of Fuentidueña de Tajo
 New Castle of Manzanares el Real
 Old Castle of Manzanares el Real
 Castle of Torrejón de Velasco
 Castle of Torremocha (Santorcaz)
 Castle of Villarejo de Salvanés
 Castle of Villaviciosa de Odón
 Castle of Viñuelas
 Atalaya de Arrebatacapas
 Atalaya de El Berrueco
 Atalaya de El Vellón
 Atalaya de Venturada
 Atalaya de Torrelodones
 Torreón of Arroyomolinos
 Torreón of Fuentelámparas (Robledo de Chavela)
 Torreón of Pinto
 Tower of los Huesos (Madrid)
 Tower of Mirabel
 Walls of Buitrago del Lozoya
 Christian Walls of Madrid
 Muslim Walls of Madrid
 Royal Alcázar of Madrid

Region of Murcia
 
 Castle of Aledo
 Castle of San Juan de las Águilas
 Castle of Lorca
 Castle of Xiquena in Lorca
 Castle of Tirieza in Lorca
 Castle of Felí in Lorca
 Castle of la Concepción of Cartagena
 Castle of la Atalaya (Cartagena)
 Castle of Galeras of Cartagena
 Castle of San Julián (Cartagena)
 Castle of los moros of Cartagena
 Castle of Jumilla
 Castle of Monteagudo
 Castle of los Vélez in Mula
 Castle of Moratalla
 Tower fortress of Alguazas.
 Tower of Santa Elena
 Tower of Cope
 Hişn Mulīna
 Walls of Charles III

Navarre

 Alcazaba and Castle of Tudela
 Castle of Xabier
 Castle of Santakara
 Castle of Amaiur
 Castle of Garaño
 Castle of Orzorrotz
 Castle of Peña (Navarre)
 Castle of Deio
 Castle of Zalatambor
 Castle palace of Martzilla
 Palace of the Kings of Navarre of Olite
 Citadel of Pamplona
 Tower Monreal
 Walls of Tudela
 Cerco de Artajona
 Old town of Pamplona

La Rioja

 Castle of Aguas Mansas in Agoncillo, restored and converted in the town hall.
 Castle of Aguilar del Río Alhama, there are only a few ruins.
 Castle of Arnedo
 Castle of Autol
 Castle of Castañares de las Cuevas
 Castle of Clavijo
 Castle of Cornago
 Castle of Davalillo
 Castle of Herce
 Castle of Jubera
 Castle of Leiva
 Castle of Quel
 Castle of Sajazarra
 Castle of San Vicente de la Sonsierra
 Castle of Cuzcurrita de Río Tirón
 Tower fort of Anguciana
 Walls of the Revellín (Logroño)

Valencian Community

Alicante 

 Castle of les Atzahares
 Castle of Agost
 Castle of Agres
 Castle of Aigües
 Castle of Aixa
 Castle of de Alfofra
 Castle of Ambra
 Castle of Banyeres
 Castle of Barchell
 Castle of Bernia
 Castle of Biar
 Castle of Castalla
 Castle of Cocentaina
 Castle of Coix
 Castle of Dénia
 Castle of Elda
 Castle of Forna
 Castle of Guardamar
 Castle of la Costurera
 Castle of la Mola
 Castle of la Murta
 Castle del Mascarat
 Castle of Monforte del Cid
 Castle of Monòver
 Castle of Montemar
 Castle of Moraira
 Castle of Orihuela
 Castle of Penàguila
 Castle of Penella
 Castle of Perputxent
 Castle of Petrer
 Castle of Polop
 Castle del Riu
 Castle of Salvatierra (Villena)
 Castle of Santa Bàrbara
 Castle of Sant Ferran (Alicante)
 Castle of Santa Pola
 Castle of Saix
 Castle of Villena or Castle of la Atalaya
 Castle of Tàrbena
 Castle of Tibi
 Palace of Altamira
 Tower Águilas
 Tower del Aguiló
 Tower of Alcalalí
 Tower del Barranc d'Aigües
 Tower of Beneixama
 Tower of Cap Roig
 Tower del Cap d'Or
 Tower del Carabassí (Santa Pola)
 Tower of Embergonyes
 Tower of Escaletes or Tower del Pep
 Tower of la Calaforra
 Tower of la Casota
 Tower of la Font Bona
 Tower of la Horadada
 Tower of la Talaiola (Santa Pola)
 Towers of Monserrate (Orihuela)
 Tower del Gerro
 Tower del Moro (Torrevieja)
 Tower del Negret
 Tower of Tamarit
 Torreta de Canor
 Walls of Orihuela
 Walls of Tabarca

Castellón 

 Castle of Abenromà
 Castle of Atzeneta
 Castle of Albalat dels Ànecses
 Castle of Albocàsser
 Castle of Alcalatén
 Castle of Alcudia de Veo
 Castle of Almenara
 Castle of Almonacid
 Castle of Artana
 Castle of Ayódar
 Castle of Azuébar
 Castle of Benalí
 Castle of Borriol
 Castle del Bou Negre
 Castle of Castellnovo
 Castle of Castro
 Castle of Cervera del Maestre
 Castle of El Toro
 Castle of Eslida
 Castle of Espadillaes
 Castle of Fadrell
 Castle of Fanzara
 Castle of Ganalur
 Castle of Herbers
 Castle of La Todolella
 Castle of les Torrocelles
 Castle of Mauz
 Castle of Mirabet (Cabanes)
 Castle of Montornés
 Castle of Morella
 Castle of Olocau
 Castle of Onda
 Castle of Peniscola
 Castle of Tales
 Castle of Toga
 Castle of Vialeva
 Castle of Vilafamés
 Castle of Villamalur
 Castle of Xinquer
 Castle of Xivert
 Castle-palace of the Ximénez d'Urrea or Castle of Urrea
 Palace-castle of Betxí
 Tower of Càlig
 Tower of Cap i Corb
 Tower del Marqués or Tower of Na Blanca
 Tower Ebrí
 Tower of L'Oró
 Tower del Mal Paso
 Tower dels Moros (Cinctorres)
 Tower del Pilón
 Tower of Anníbal
 Tower Quadrada de Argelita
 Tower Redonda (Argelita)
 Tower of Sant Vicent (Benicàssim)
 Tower of Torrechiva
 Fortified town of Torralba del Pinar

Valencia 

 Castle of Ademúses
 Castle of Ademúses
 Castle of Albalat dels Sorellses
 Castle of Aleduaes
 Castle of Alginetes
 Castle of Andillaes
 Castle of Ayoraes
 Castle of Bairénes
 Castle of Benissanóes
 Castle of Beselgaes
 Castle of Bolbaitees
 Castle of Buñoles
 Castle of Carrícolaes
 Castle of Castielfabib
 Castle of Cebollaes
 Castle of Corbera
 Castle of Cullera
 Castle of Dénia
 Castle of El Puig
 Castle of Jalance
 Castle of Jarafuel
 Castle of Macastre
 Castle of Marinyén
 Castle of Millares
 Castle of Moixent
 Castle of Montesa
 Castle of Montroy
 Castle of Navarrés
 Castle del Piló
 Castle of Quesa
 Castle of Rugat
 Castle of Sagunto
 Castle of Segart
 Castle of Serra
 Castle of Sot de Chera
 Castle of Sumacàrcer
 Castle of Torres Torres
 Castle of Turís
 Castle of Vallada
 Castle of Villalonga
 Castle of Xàtiva
 Castle of Xera
 Castle of Xio
 Castle of Xiva
 Castle of Xulilla
 Castle palace of Bicorp
 Palace - Castle of Alaquàs
 Palace - Castle of Albalat dels Sorells
 Palace Castle of Aielo de Malferit
 Fortress of Requena
 Tower of the Castle of Torrent
 Torre de la Plaça (Benifaió)
 Tower del Marenyet
 Tower Mussa or Tower of L'Horta
 Towers of Quart
 Towers of Serrans
 La Torrecilla (Chelva)
 Tower of Paterna
 Tower of Santa Anna
 Walls of Alzira

Number of fortifications by provinces
In the following table, are related the various Spanish provinces, ordered according to the number of existing fortifications, both castles themselves as towers, watchtowers, bunkers, walls and castros

It attached the references to some of the relevant statements of Cultural Assets of the different Councils of Culture of the Autonomous Communities:
 Andalusia: Councils of Culture of the Junta de Andalucía

References

External links
Spanish castles (CastillosNet)
Spanish castles
Castle Inventory on Ideal Spain
Best castles to visit in Spain
Castles to stay in Spain
Photo album from La Iruela Castle - Jaén - Andalusia
Number of Spanish Castles today

Spain
Castles
Spain
Castles